The Benin Armed Forces (FAB) constitutes the army, navy, air force, and national gendarmerie of Benin. For a number of years, the Belgian Armed Forces have had an active programme of co-operation with Benin, offering training and coaching, donating redundant military equipment and using the country for limited military exercises.

History 
The constitution of 11 December 1990 ordered the Benin Armed Forces to ensure effective, permanent and efficient security coverage of the territory, as well as border vigilance.

The national gendarmerie no longer exists since 2019. It has been merged with the national police.

Branches

Army
, the Army had a strength of 4,300. It includes 1 armoured squadron, 3 infantry battalions, 1 commando/airborne battalion, 1 artillery battery, and 1 engineer battalion, and 1 National Fire Brigade. The army has the following units:

 1st Parachute Commando Battalion
 1st Motorized Intervention Battalion
 1st Armoured Group
 National Group of Firefighters
 1st Combined Arms Battalion
 2nd Combined Arms Battalion
 3rd Combined Arms Battalion
 7th Combined Arms Battalion
 8th Combined Arms Battalion
 1st Mixed Artillery Battalion
 1st Engineer Battalion
 1st Signal Battalion
 1st Materiel Battalion
 1st Train Battalion
 Headquarters Group

Air Force
After achieving independence from France in 1960 the Benin Air Force was transport equipped with seven French-supplied Douglas C-47s, four MH.1521 Broussards and two Agusta-Bell 47Gs. Two F-27s entered service in 1978 for transport duties before being transferred to Air Benin. Also during the same era, two AN-26s were acquired. In late 1985 two Dornier Do-28s entered service to replace the C-47s. A single DHC-6 Twin Otter was acquired in 1989.

Navy
As of 2012, the navy has a strength of approximately 200 personnel. It operates two ex-Chinese patrol boats, which are designated the Matelot Brice Kpomasse class.

Republican Guard 
The Republican Guard is responsible for the security of the President of the Republic, ministers, members of the government, institutions of the Republic and their leader.

Equipment

Infantry weapons

Heavy weapons

Aircraft

References

Works consulted

Military of Benin